The National Assembly is the lower house of the Parliament of Gabon. It has 143 members, elected by Two round system

Latest results

Members (since 1990)
List of members of the National Assembly of Gabon, 1990–1996
List of members of the National Assembly of Gabon, 2001–2006
List of members of the National Assembly of Gabon, 2006–2011
List of members of the National Assembly of Gabon (current)

See also
List of presidents of the National Assembly of Gabon

External links
Website of the National Assembly

References

Gabon
Government of Gabon